Rune is a unisex, though predominantly masculine given name derived from the Old Norse word rún, meaning "secret". It is earliest attested in a runestone as runi. It is a common name in Norway, Sweden, Denmark, and popular in Belgium, where it ranked in top thirty names for baby boys in 2006 and was the tenth most popular name for boys in 2006 in the Flemish Region of Belgium. Rúni, a variant of the name, was among the ten most popular names given to baby boys in the Faroe Islands, Denmark, in 2007. In the United States, Rune is a much less common name- in 2021 there were only 35 baby boys and only 9 baby girls named Rune. Notable people with the name include:

Arts and entertainment
Rune Johan Andersson (born 1945), Norwegian cartoonist, illustrator and children's writer
Rune Andréasson (1925–1999), Swedish comics artist
Rune Angell-Jacobsen (born 1947), Norwegian novelist
Rune Christiansen (born 1963), Norwegian poet and novelist
Rune Ericson (1924–2015), Swedish cinematographer
Rune Eriksen (born 1975), Norwegian metal musician
Rune Gustafsson (1933–2012), Swedish jazz guitarist
Rune Halvarsson (1911–1969), Swedish actor
Rune Hassner (1928–2003), Swedish photographer and film director
Rune T. Kidde (1957–2013), Danish writer and musician
Rune Klakegg (born 1955), Norwegian jazz pianist and composer
Rune Klan (born 1976), Danish comedian and magician
Rune Reilly Kölsch (born 1977), Danish techno musician
Rune Kristoffersen (born 1957), Norwegian musician
Rune Larsen (born 1948), Norwegian singer
Rune Lindblad (1923–1991), Swedish composer
Rune Lindstrøm (born 1963), Norwegian drummer
Rune Lindström (screenwriter) (1916–1973), Swedish screenwriter and actor
Rune Rebellion (born 1965), Norwegian rock guitarist
Rune Rebne (born 1961), Norwegian composer
Rune Rudberg (born 1961), Norwegian singer
Rune Temte (born 1965), Norwegian actor
Rune Waldekranz (1911–2003), Swedish film producer
Rune Westberg (born 1974), Danish songwriter and producer

Politics
Rune Berglund (born 1939), Swedish politician
Rune Fredh (born 1945–2006), Norwegian politician
Rune Gerhardsen (1946–2021), Norwegian politician
Rune Gustavsson (1920–2002), Swedish politician
Rune B. Johansson (1915–1982), Swedish politician
Rune E. Kristiansen (born 1948), Norwegian politician
Rune Lund (born 1976), Danish politician
Rune Resaland (born 1956), Norwegian diplomat
Rune Selj (born 1952), Norwegian politician
Rune J. Skjælaaen (born 1954), Norwegian politician

Sports
Rune Åhlund (1930–2019), Swedish long-distance runner
Rune Almén (born 1952), Swedish high jumper
Rune Alvarado (born 1997), US Virgin Islands footballer
Rune Andersson (rower) (1930–2006), Swedish rower
Rune Andersson (sport shooter) (1919–1992), Swedish sports shooter
Rune Berger (born 1978), Norwegian footballer
Rune Bratseth (born 1961), Norwegian footballer
Rune Dahl (born 1955), Norwegian rower
Rune Dahmke (born 1993), German handball player
Rune Dalsjø (born 1975), Norwegian rally driver
Rune Djurhuus (born 1970), Norwegian chess player
Rune Emanuelsson (1923–1993), Swedish footballer
Rune Erland (born 1968), Norwegian handball player
Rune Ertsås (born 1987), Norwegian footballer
Rune Flodman (1926–2014), Swedish sport shooter
Rune Frantsen (born 1991), Danish footballer
Rune Glifberg (born 1974), Danish professional skateboarder
Rune Gulliksen (born 1963), Norwegian ice hockey player
Rune Gustafsson (athlete) (1919–2011), Swedish middle-distance runner
Rune Hagen (born 1975), Norwegian footballer
Rune Hammarström (1920–1999), Swedish speed skater
Rune Hastrup (born 1991), Danish footballer
Rune Hauge (born 1954), Norwegian football agent
Rune Haugseng, Norwegian handball player
Rune Hermans (born 1999), Belgian female gymnast
Rune Holta (born 1973), Norwegian speedway rider
Rune Høydahl (born 1969), Norwegian mountain biker
Rune Jansson (1932–2018), Swedish wrestler
Rune Jarstein (born 1984), Norwegian footballer
Rune Jogert (born 1977), Norwegian racing cyclist
Rune Johansson (1920–1998), Swedish sportsperson
Rune Johnsson (born 1933), Swedish wrestler
Rune Kristiansen (born 1964), Norwegian freestyle skier
Rune Lange (born 1977), Norwegian footballer
Rune Larsson (disambiguation), multiple people 
Rune Lindström (alpine skier) (born 1944), Swedish former alpine skier
Rune Lorentsen (born 1961), Norwegian wheelchair curler
Rune Ohm (born 1980), Danish handball player
Rune Olijnyk (born 1968), Norwegian ski jumper
Rune Ottesen (born 1954), Norwegian footballer
Rune Pedersen (disambiguation), multiple people 
Rune Skarsfjord (born 1970), Norwegian football coach
Rune Skjærvold (born 1974), Norwegian handball player
Rune Sola (born 1985), Norwegian speedway rider
Rune Stordal (born 1979), Norwegian speed skater
Rune Ulsing (born 1984), Danish badminton player
Rune Ulvestad (born 1957), Norwegian footballer

Other
Rune Elmqvist (1906–1996), Swedish inventor
Rune Gjeldnes (born 1971), Norwegian adventurer
Rune Ottosen (born 1950), Norwegian academic
Rune Skarstein (born 1940), Norwegian radical economist
Rune Slagstad (born 1945), Norwegian historian

References

Scandinavian masculine given names
Danish masculine given names
Norwegian masculine given names
Swedish masculine given names